David "Dave" Musser is a professor emeritus of computer science at the Rensselaer Polytechnic Institute in Troy, New York, United States.

He is known for his work in generic programming, particularly as applied to C++, and his collaboration with Alexander Stepanov.

In , he developed the sorting algorithm called introsort (also known as introspective sort), and the related selection algorithm called introselect, to provide algorithms that are both efficient and have optimal worst-case performance, for use in the STL.

In 2007 he retired from Rensselaer.

Selected publications

References

External links
 David Musser's home page

Year of birth missing (living people)
Living people
Rensselaer Polytechnic Institute faculty